Antonina Maria Żabińska, née Erdman (18 July 1908 – 19 March 1971), was a Polish writer connected, through her husband Jan Żabiński, with the Warsaw Zoo.

Life

Antonina Żabińska's literary debut was a short story, "Pamiętnik żyrafy" ("Memoirs of a Giraffe"), in Moje pisemko (My Magazine, 1934).  Another story, "Jak białowieskie rysice zostały Warszawiankami" ("How Female Lynxes from the Białowieża Forest Became Warsaw Residents") appeared in 1936 as the first part of an "Opowieści przyrodnicze" ("Nature Tales") series. 1939 saw her first book, Dżolly i S-ka (Jolly and Company), with a postwar re-edition subtitled "Z dziejów Warszawskiego Ogrodu Zoologicznego" ("From the History of the Warsaw Zoo").

During World War II, Antonina and her husband Jan sheltered many Jews, including Warsaw Ghetto escapees, in the emptied animal enclosures and their private home on the zoo grounds. For this Antonina and her husband received the Righteous Among the Nations award in 1965. On October 30, 1968 a tree planting ceremony was held at Yad Vashem honoring them.

After the war, Żabińska's children's books, "Rysice" (Lynxes, 1948) and "Borsunio" (Badger, 1964) were published. In 1968 she released a diary, Ludzie i zwierzęta (People and Animals), with recollections of her activities during the World War II occupation. 1970 saw her last book, Nasz dom w zoo (Our House in the Zoo), about the Warsaw Zoo.

She was buried at the historic Powązki Cemetery in Warsaw.

In 2007 Diane Ackerman made Antonina and Jan the main characters of her book The Zookeeper's Wife, based on the diary, Ludzie i zwierzęta (People and Animals). In 2017 a feature-film adaptation of Ackerman's book was released, starring Jessica Chastain as Antonina Żabińska.

In 2008 Antonina Żabińska was posthumously honored with the Commander's Cross of the Order of Polonia Restituta.

See also
 List of Poles

Notes

1908 births
1971 deaths
Polish children's writers
Polish women children's writers
Polish Righteous Among the Nations
Burials at Powązki Cemetery
Recipients of the Order of Polonia Restituta
20th-century Polish women